Mollisia is a genus of fungi in the family Dermateaceae. The genus contains 121 species.

Species

Mollisia amenticola
Mollisia aquosa
Mollisia caesia
Mollisia caespiticia
Mollisia caricina
Mollisia casaresiae
Mollisia chionea
Mollisia cinerascens
Mollisia cinerea
Mollisia cinerella
Mollisia cinereo-olivascens
Mollisia cirsiicola
Mollisia clavata
Mollisia coerulans
Mollisia conigena
Mollisia coprosmae
Mollisia culmina
Mollisia dactyligluma
Mollisia dextrinospora
Mollisia discolor
Mollisia erumpens
Mollisia escharodes
Mollisia euphrasiae
Mollisia fallax
Mollisia fallens
Mollisia fungorum
Mollisia fuscoparaphysata
Mollisia fuscostriata
Mollisia heterosperma
Mollisia humidicola
Mollisia hydrophila
Mollisia jugosa
Mollisia juncina
Mollisia leucosphaeria
Mollisia ligni
Mollisia lurida
Mollisia lychnidis
Mollisia lycopi
Mollisia macrosperma
Mollisia mediella
Mollisia melaleuca
Mollisia minutissima
Mollisia mutabilis
Mollisia myricariae
Mollisia nigrescens
Mollisia olivascens
Mollisia orcadensis
Mollisia palustris
Mollisia poaeoides
Mollisia populi
Mollisia rabenhorstii
Mollisia ramealis
Mollisia rehmii
Mollisia sordidula
Mollisia spectabilis
Mollisia sphaeroides
Mollisia stellata
Mollisia stromaticola
Mollisia subcorticalis
Mollisia submelaena
Mollisia tenuispora
Mollisia teucrii
Mollisia typhae
Mollisia uda
Mollisia undulatodepressula
Mollisia ventosa

See also
 List of Dermateaceae genera

References

Dermateaceae genera
Dermateaceae